Androcles and the Lion is a 1952 RKO film produced by Gabriel Pascal from the 1912 George Bernard Shaw play of the same name. It was Pascal's last film, made two years after the death of Shaw, his long-standing friend and mentor, and two years before Pascal's own death.

Plot
Androcles, a gentle Christian tailor, is on the run from his Roman persecutors, accompanied by his nagging wife Megaera. While they are hiding in the forest, a wild lion approaches them. Megaera swoons, but tender-hearted Androcles sees that a large thorn is deeply embedded in the lion's paw; he draws it out while soothing the beast with baby-talk. While Androcles and the lion—whom he names Tommy—are becoming best buddies, his wife escapes, and when soldiers come upon Androcles and Tommy wrestling playfully, he is accused of sorcery.

Androcles is next seen in a procession of Christian prisoners on their way to the Colosseum in Rome. They are joined by the fierce recent Christian convert Ferrovius, who subsequently provides much of the comic relief in his struggle to keep his bellicose nature in check. Love interest is provided by the growing attraction between the Roman Captain and the nobly born Christian convert Lavinia.

Eventually the party is sent into the arena to be slaughtered, but when Ferrovius demonstrates his powers of conversion—and kills all of the gladiators—Antoninus Caesar declares that all his subjects should become Christians and offers him a commission in the Praetorian Guards. Ferrovius accepts. To appease the crowd, it is necessary to choose one Christian to be savaged by a lion, and Androcles volunteers "to uphold the honour of the tailors." It turns out that the lion is the one that Androcles helped in the forest, and the two waltz round the arena to the delight of the audience. The Emperor dashes behind the scenes to get a closer look and has to be rescued from the lion by Androcles. He then orders an end to the persecution of Christians and allows Androcles and his new 'pet' to depart in peace.

Cast

 Jean Simmons as Lavinia
 Victor Mature as the Captain
 Alan Young as Androcles
 Robert Newton as Ferrovius
 Maurice Evans as Caesar
 Elsa Lanchester as Megaera
 Reginald Gardiner as Lentulus
 Gene Lockhart the Menagerie Keeper
 Alan Mowbray as the Editor of Gladiators
 Noel Willman as Spintho
 John Hoyt as Cato
 Jim Backus as the Centurion
 Lowell Gilmore as Metellus 
 Woody Strode as the Lion
 Strother Martin as Soldier
 Sylvia Lewis as the Chief of the Vestal Virgins

Note that the opening sequence of the film places it during the time of Emperor Antoninus Pius, but the character is only addressed as "Caesar" during the film, as that was the formal way of addressing Roman Emperors.

Production
Harpo Marx was originally signed to play Androcles, and after the first five weeks of shooting, Pascal was thrilled with the results; but Howard Hughes, who had seen Young on TV, hired him for the lead, and Harpo was replaced.
George Sanders was meant to play Caesar but was unable to get out of another commitment. José Ferrer was mentioned for the part of Androcles.

Under Pascal's contract with George Bernard Shaw, the film had to include at least 75% of Shaw's original dialogue in the screenplay. This was not a problem for this particular play since the play was short; indeed, material had to be added.

Victor Mature had a contract with RKO to make one film a year. However this film, while released by RKO, was produced by GB Productions.

Filming began 13 August 1951.

When it opened in American cinemas nobody laughed, so Hughes withdrew the film and shot two weeks of new sequences. In 1987, Alan Young recalled, "He put in girls with gauze and a real lion, and it became a blood-and-guts film."

References

External links
 

1952 films
1952 comedy films
American comedy films
British comedy films
British films based on plays
American films based on plays
Films about lions
Films directed by Chester Erskine
Films produced by Gabriel Pascal
Films scored by Friedrich Hollaender
Films set in ancient Rome
Films set in the 2nd century
Films set in the Roman Empire
RKO Pictures films
American black-and-white films
1950s English-language films
1950s American films
1950s British films